HMS Amphion was a Royal Navy 32-gun fifth-rate frigate of the Amazon class built in Chatham in 1780 which blew up on 22 September 1796.

Service
On 6 September 1781, a small squadron under the command of Amphions captain, John Bazely, in conjunction with General Benedict Arnold, completely destroyed the town of New London, Connecticut, together with stores and shipping in the harbour.

On 3 January 1782 Amphion recaptured the British sloop , which the French had captured at the capitulation of Yorktown on 19 October 1781.

Sinking
On 22 September 1796, Amphion was completing repairs at Plymouth, England. She was lying alongside a sheer hulk close to the dockyard jetty. Being due to sail the next day, she had more than a hundred relatives and visitors on board in addition to her crew.

At about 4 p.m. she exploded without warning, killing 300 out of the 312 aboard. Among the few survivors was her captain, Israel Pellew, who went on to command a ship at the Battle of Trafalgar and ended the Napoleonic Wars as a Rear-Admiral. Pellew had been dining in his cabin with Captain Swaffield of Overyssel and the first lieutenant of Amphion when the explosion threw them about; Pellew managed to rush to the cabin window before a second explosion blew him into the water, whence he was rescued.

Apart from Pellew, two lieutenants, a boatswain, three or four seamen, a marine, one woman, and a child were the only survivors.

The cause of the disaster was never fully proven, but it was thought that the ship's gunner had accidentally spilled gunpowder near the fore magazine which had then accidentally ignited and set off the magazine itself. The gunner had been suspected of stealing gunpowder, and on the day of the disaster he was reported to have been drunk and probably as a result less careful than usual.

Citations

References

External links
 

Frigates of the Royal Navy
Shipwrecks of England
Maritime incidents in 1796
Ships built in Chatham
1780 ships